The 2016 Scottish Rugby U-20 Championship will be contested from July - August 2016. The tournament is run by the Scottish Rugby Union and will be competed for by the 4 regional teams from the BT Sport Scottish Rugby Academy.

The U-20 Championship is three rounds of the regional round-robin with conclusion on 21 August.

Teams

The following teams take part in the 2016 Scottish Rugby U-20 Championship:

Standings

The round robin standings for the 2016 Scottish Rugby U-20 Championship were:

Fixtures and results

The following matches were played in the 2016 Scottish Rugby U-20 Championship:

 All times are GMT.

Round One

Round Two

Round Three

Finals

Champions final

References

2015–16
2016–17 in Scottish rugby union